Anatoliy Yuriyovych Momot (born 12 April 1958 in Dykanka) is a Soviet and Ukrainian football coach.

References

External links
 Brief bio at Vorskla Poltava website

1958 births
Living people
Ukrainian football managers
FC Vorskla Poltava managers
Ukrainian Premier League managers
Sportspeople from Poltava Oblast